The 43rd Exxon Mastercard 12 Hours of Sebring was an endurance racing sports car event held at Sebring International Raceway from March 15-18, 1995. The race served as the second round of the 1995 IMSA GT Championship.

Race results
Class winners in bold.

External links
Race Results

12 Hours of Sebring
12 Hours of Sebring
12 Hours of Sebring
12 Hours of Sebring